In the Motherhood is an American television sitcom that debuted on ABC as a midseason entry and ran from March 26 to June 25, 2009. The series was produced by ABC Studios in association with Spud TV and Mindshare Entertainment.

Plot
The series focused on Rosemary, Jane, and Emily, loosely inspired by real-life everyday moms.

Rosemary, who has been married numerous times but currently single, is a fast and loose free-wheeling mom with a teenaged son, Sid, who seems to be more responsible than his non-traditional mother.

Rosemary's best friend, Jane, is a recently divorced mother of two girls, pre-teen Annie, and eight-month-old Sophie. As she tries to keep her career and home afloat, Jane has also hired a "manny," Horatio, to help her out with her working mother duties. Horatio also has the ability to "communicate" with Sophie and believes she is the only person that really "gets" him.

Jane's younger sister, Emily, is a model stay-at-home-super-mom for her two young children, Esther and Bill. Emily also believes in perfection which she sees as key to her family life and takes parenting as seriously as any mother could. Her home is a work of art, and her kids are polite and sweet. Emily is married to Jason, the breadwinner in the family, who likes his food to be organic and determined to make sure that his family is at the top of their class.

Cast and characters
Cheryl Hines as Jane
Megan Mullally as Rosemary
Matt Prokop as Luke
Horatio Sanz as Horatio
Jessica St. Clair as Emily
RonReaco Lee as Jason

Production
Loosely based on the popular online web series created by Mindshare and produced by Science + Fiction and Microsoft's Branded Entertainment and Experience Team (BEET) in 2007 in conjunction with Suave hair care products and Sprint Nextel, this adaptation chronicled the daily and hilarious perils of three mothers, with most of their stories being adapted from everyday real-life mothers. The success of the webisodes led to ABC's announcement to order 7 initial episodes for the 2008-2009 TV season after the premiere. Sprint and Suave had an involvement in the series as well.

Casting
Whereas the webisodes featured Leah Remini, Jenny McCarthy, and Chelsea Handler in the lead roles, Handler was supposed to be the only cast member from the series to make the transition to the small screen. But on November 24, 2008, TV Guide reported that the series would instead star Megan Mullally and Cheryl Hines. In addition, Horatio Sanz and Jessica St. Clair had also been cast, with Sanz playing Hines's manny and St. Clair playing Hines's "intimidating younger sister," who doesn't discipline her children. Handler decided to drop out of the project due to scheduling commitments to her E! show Chelsea Lately.

Reception and scheduling
The series had not been received well by critics, and despite ABC's promotional push in the hope of weakening NBC's Thursday night comedy lineup, not many viewers, especially fans of the original web series, flocked to see the show.

On April 30, 2009, ABC announced that it was pulling the series. Followed by the return of Ugly Betty to the schedule while on May 15, 2009, ABC announced that In the Motherhood would return once again, to burn off the remaining episodes. But on June 30, 2009, ABC announced that they pulled In the Motherhood and instead doubled up on Samantha Who? for Thursday, July 2 and Thursday, July 9 at 8:30PM Eastern/7:30PM Central.

Episodes

U.S. Nielsen ratings

References

External links
 (Web series)
 (Television series)
SitcomsOnline.com Review

2000s American single-camera sitcoms
2009 American television series debuts
2009 American television series endings
Television series based on Internet-based works
Motherhood
American Broadcasting Company original programming
Pregnancy-themed television shows
Television series by ABC Studios
Television shows set in Los Angeles
American comedy web series